Tetraodon is a genus in the pufferfish family (Tetraodontidae) found in freshwater in Africa. It is the type genus of the family and historically included numerous other species; several Asian species were only moved to the genera Dichotomyctere, Leiodon and Pao in 2013.

Species
There are 6 recognized species in this genus:

 Tetraodon duboisi Poll, 1959
 Tetraodon lineatus Linnaeus, 1758 (Fahaka pufferfish, Nile pufferfish, lineatus puffer or globe fish)
 Tetraodon mbu Boulenger, 1899 (mbu pufferfish or giant pufferfish)
 Tetraodon miurus Boulenger, 1902 (Congo pufferfish or potato pufferfish)
 Tetraodon pustulatus A. D. Murray, 1857 (Cross River pufferfish)
 Tetraodon schoutedeni Pellegrin, 1926

References

 
Extant Miocene first appearances
Ray-finned fish genera
Taxa named by Carl Linnaeus